Ricardo Sepúlveda (19 May 1941 – 3 February 2014) was a Chilean football (soccer) manager and player.

Managerial career
Following his retirement he went on to coach several teams in El Salvador including Alianza, Atlético Marte, UES, Independiente, C.D. Santiagueño. 

He coached Alianza to the 1987 final defeating Aguila on penalties.

He also coached in Guatemala with Suchitepéquez in 1981.

Death
Sepulveda died on 3 February 2014, aged 72. He will always be remembered as a loving father, a great player and a sweet grandfather, may he rest in peace.

Honours

Player
Alianza
Primera División de Fútbol de El Salvador (2):  1965-1966, 1966-1967,
CONCACAF Champions' Cup (1): 1967
Atletico Marte
Primera División de Fútbol de El Salvador (2): 1969-1970 y 1970-1971
Colo Colo
Primera División de Chile (1): 1962/63

Coach
Alianza
Primera División de Fútbol de El Salvador (1): 1987

References

External links
 “Nunca me dejaron ir”
 

1941 births
2014 deaths
People from Temuco
Chilean footballers
Colo-Colo footballers
Alianza F.C. footballers
C.D. Atlético Marte footballers
Municipal Limeño footballers
Chilean Primera División players
Salvadoran Primera División players
Chilean football managers
Chilean expatriate football managers
C.D. Suchitepéquez managers
Atletico Marte managers
Chilean expatriate sportspeople in El Salvador
Expatriate footballers in El Salvador
Expatriate football managers in El Salvador
Association footballers not categorized by position